Morni is a village and tourist attraction in the Morni Hills at the height of  in the Panchkula district of the Indian state of Haryana.
The name of Morni is believed to derive from a queen who once ruled the area two thousand years back. She was said to be a just and noble ruler. Morni was also a jagir of Raja Mir Syed Muhammad Baquar Ali Khan.

Geography

The Morni Hills are offshoots of the Shivalik range of the Himalayas, which run in two parallel ranges.

Tourism

The Haryana Government has constructed the Mountain Quail Resort for tourists, along with a motorable road to connect the Morni Hills with the Haryana State Highway near Panchkula. Three further roads connect Morni to Chandigarh and other nearby towns.

Forts

Morni Fort Museum
 
There is a two thousand year old fort in the Morni area, which was built by Queen Morni. Local folk songs mention how noble and just was queen Morni. The hills are covered by pine trees, and are popular trekking locations. The fort also has a museum built in fy 2017-18.

Forests Department of Haryana has converted the fort into a museum and nature study centre which houses old photographs of the fort, endangered birds and animals, awareness of dangers of plastic, etc.

Garhi Kotaha Fort 
Garhi Kotaha is a fort on NH1 which lies 27 km south of the Morni Fort and 3 km east of Raipur Rani tehsil headquarter. It now lie in ruins since it was partially demolished by the British Raj after the Indian Rebellion of 1857. Mir Muslims of Kotaha ruled from Garhi Kotaha Fort with smaller forts at Morni and Massompur.

Masoompur Fort 
Masoompur Fort is a smaller outpost fort with thick stone-brick masonry walls on a mud hillock. It is northeast of Massompur village which is 5 km from the main Garhi Kotaha Fort via road passing through Rehana village. It was built to control the access route to Samlotha temple, which lies northeast of the fort, to collect the hefty jizya (religious ransom tax) from the Hindu's pilgrimage.

Morni Hill Waterfall
Waterfall, access via a track in the forest, is active in the rainy season.

Morni Pheasant Breeding Center

Morni Pheasant Breeding Center focuses on the breeding of red junglefowls and kalij pheasants, and regularly releases birds raised in captivity into the wild every year. Red junglefowl had become extinct from most of its range and there are concerns of loss of its genetic purity due to breeding with other related species of fowls. Consequently, in 1991-92 a pheasant breeding center at Morni Hills was established with 6 aviaries and a walk-in a aviary to preserve the wild breed.

Morni Hill Archaeological Temple Site 
Thakur Dwar temple, dedicated to lord Krishna, at the banks of Tikkar Taal is built on the site of 10th Century temple. Excavations in 1970 found Hindu sculptures dating back to Pratihara era (7th to 11th century CE), some of which are housed at Government Museum and Art Gallery, Chandigarh and some remain in-situ at the Thakur Dwara temple at Morni Hills.

Bhuri Singh Deota temple, dedicated to the folk deity Buri Singh, is the cliff-temple at Pejarli village at a height of 1870 metres with unbroken scenic view of Ghaggar river (Sarasvati).

Herbal forest
In 2018, Haryana government starting establishing a 50,000 hectare herbal forest with the help of community self-help groups and with the assistance of Baba Ramdev's Patanjali Yogpeeth.

See also

Jatayu Conservation Breeding Centre, Pinjore
Adi Badri, Haryana
Geography of Haryana
List of National Parks & Wildlife Sanctuaries of Haryana, India
List of mountains in India
List of mountains by elevation
 World Herbal Forest

References

External links
 Chandigarh to Morni Hills

Tourist attractions in Panchkula district
Villages in Panchkula district
Hill stations in Haryana
Sarasvati River
Mountains of Haryana
Himalayas
Highest points of Indian states and union territories
Hindu pilgrimage sites in India
Archaeological sites in Haryana